Okandžije is a settlement in the Municipality of Mrkonjić Grad of the Republika Srpska entity in Bosnia and Herzegovina.

Name 
Okandžije derives from a Princess which left the Prizrenac Fortress of rode a horse towards the area of Okandžije where she lost her Kandžija and shouted O, Kandžija!.

Demographics 
According to the 1991 census, the village had a total of 143 inhabitants. Ethnic groups in the village include:

 Serbs: 143 (100%)

According to the 2013 census, the village had a total of 48 inhabitants. Ethnic groups in the village include:

 Serbs 48 (100%)

References 

Populated places in Republika Srpska